BRUNO was the first commercial computer software program for creating presentations (Presentation program) using a WYSIWYG user interface.  BRUNO, which originated on the Hewlett Packard HP-1000 F-Series computer, was developed by Jim Long and Philip Walden of Hewlett Packard. The application was finished in 1979 and was used around the world by HP customers.  BRUNO was later ported to the HP-3000 and renamed HP-Draw.

Trivia 

 Bruno was named after a hand puppet used to train field sales representatives.
 Bruno became HP-Draw mostly because Robert Dea, a HP-3000 team member, and Philip Walden shared work topics during their long van pool rides.

References

Presentation software